Johannes W. Vieweg is an American medical school dean, university professor, and physician-scientist, presently residing in the city of Fort Lauderdale, Florida.

Early life and education
Vieweg received his medical degree from the Technical University of Munich in 1983. After relocating to the United States, in 1991, he spent three years as a post-doctoral research fellow at Memorial Sloan-Kettering Cancer Center, New York, NY and Duke University, Durham, NC under the mentorship of Eli Gilboa, PhD, a prominent expert in retrovirology and cell therapy.

Professional Background
In 1999, Vieweg completed the Duke residency-training program in urologic surgery and, subsequently, enjoyed highly productive nine-year tenure as faculty and Vice Chair of Research in the Duke Department of Urology under the chairmanship of David F. Paulson, MD. Much of Vieweg’s career-long scientific activity has centered on the investigation and clinical testing of genetically engineered tumor vaccines, the discovery of universal tumor antigens and the modulation of immunosuppressive T cells and myeloid cells. He also made significant contributions by discovering novel pathway-targeted interventions and developing novel prediction models for therapeutic response. More recent research interests are aligned with the field of public health, prevention medicine, implementation science and comparative effectiveness research in academic and community-based settings. Vieweg’s scientific work has received uninterrupted funding by the National Institute of Health since 1998 and is well-documented in more than 180 publications, books, commentaries and review articles.

In 2006, Vieweg was recruited to the University of Florida (UF) as the Founding Professor and Chairman of the Department of Urology. Vieweg’s recruitment from Duke University to UF was facilitated by the Florida Board of Governors’ 21st Century World Class Scholar’s program, which recognizes nationally accomplished faculty in the areas of science, technology, engineering, and mathematics (STEM). Under Vieweg’s leadership, the UF Department of Urology has witnessed remarkable advancements through the recruitment of outstanding faculty and through nationally recognized research programs. The department offers the highest level of urologic care in Florida, as reflected by UF Urology's #18 ranking in the 2014 U.S. News & World Report. Other positions held by Vieweg during his 10-year tenure at UF included: the Wayne and Marti Huizenga Endowed Research Scholar Chair, Executive Director of the UF Prostate Disease Center, Chairman of the Florida Prostate Cancer Advisory Council and Vice President of the University of Florida Clinical Practice Association.

During his tenure at UF, Vieweg further served as the American Urologic Association Research Council Chair (2010 to 2015). In executing responsibilities, he directly reported to the AUA’s Board of Directors, chaired the Research Council, and oversaw the various subcommittees of the Research Council. He periodically met with NIH leaders to discuss new research directions, grant opportunities, and funding in the urologic sciences, and participated, as AUA liaison, on NIDDK and NCI advisory board meetings.

In February 2015, Vieweg was awarded a Jefferson Science Fellowship by the National Academy of Sciences in Washington DC. This prestigious program engages distinguished scientists from across the US as Special Advisors to the US Department of State to provide scientific expertise in foreign policy development. In this position, Vieweg frequently interacted with numerous Department of State offices and governmental agencies, including the US Department of Health and Human Services and the National Science Foundation on issues of global health, health education, and health security. He frequently participated in diplomatic meetings with foreign governments to advance partnerships and implement foreign policy for the United States of America.

Current position and responsibilities
Since February 2016, Johannes Vieweg has served as the Inaugural Dean and Chief Academic Officer of the College of Allopathic Medicine at Nova Southeastern University in Fort Lauderdale, Florida. Dr. Vieweg developed the new college's academic vision and directed all logistic, strategic and financial planning processes to establish the 148th M.D. medical school in the U.S. 
The college received preliminary LCME accreditation in October 2017 and matriculated its inaugural class in July 2018. After receiving a substantial gift from the Patel Family Foundation in January 2018, the college was renamed the Dr. Kiran C. Patel College of Allopathic Medicine. In 2021, the college was awarded provisional accreditation status by LCME and will be welcoming its fourth class of students. Current work is focused on advancing to the final step of accreditation  - full accreditation - by 2022.

The college enjoys a strong clinical affiliation with the Hospital Corporation of America (HCA) East Florida Division. Seven leading HCA hospitals in South Florida are currently serving as clerkship sites and provide hands-on clinical experiences for the college’s medical students. During clinical training, students have the opportunity to work side-by-side with expert physicians in the diagnosis and treatment of patients, applying knowledge learned from the first two years of study to real-life situations. Medical students are also exposed to advanced medical cases in cardiology, surgery, infectious diseases, pulmonary diseases, renal disorders, and a host of other clinically relevant scenarios using computer-controlled high-fidelity mannequins in medical simulation centers

Dr. Vieweg is taking tangible steps to establish a world-class medical school by implementing innovative models of education, research, and healthcare delivery, with a focus on developing an integrated, value-based health system and improving health in Florida and beyond. For five consecutive years (2017-2021) Dr. Vieweg has been recognized among the South Florida Power Leaders in Healthcare, reflecting the new medical school's economic and health impact in Broward County and the broader community.

Dr. Vieweg is a passionate believer in the power of education to transform lives, develop talent and ideas that lift individuals, communities, and states through strategic partnerships, shared mission, and intellectual curiosity. He is a proven leader in managing diverse teams using a strategic systems approach that results in lasting positive changes to operations, culture, and outcomes.

References

External links 
Official profile

Duke University alumni
Nova Southeastern University faculty
Living people
Jefferson Science Fellows
Year of birth missing (living people)